The 1961 North Indian Ocean cyclone season had no bounds, but cyclones tend to form between April and December, with peaks in May and November. These dates conventionally delimit the period of each year when most tropical cyclones form in the northern Indian Ocean. There are two main seas in the North Indian Ocean—the Bay of Bengal to the east of the Indian subcontinent and the Arabian Sea to the west of India. The official Regional Specialized Meteorological Centre in this basin is the India Meteorological Department (IMD), while the Joint Typhoon Warning Center releases unofficial advisories. An average of four to six storms form in the North Indian Ocean every season with peaks in May and November. Cyclones occurring between the meridians 45°E and 100°E are included in the season by the IMD.

Systems

Depression One

A depression developed on January 9. It cut across northern Ceylon and southern India before dissipating on January 11.

Deep Depression Two

A deep depression developed in the Bay of Bengal on February 18. It moved generally northward and dissipated on February 21.

Severe Cyclonic Storm Three (Winnie)

From May 6–9, the JTWC tracked this system as Tropical Storm Winnie.

In East Pakistan, 11,468 people were killed.

Severe Cyclonic Storm Four

It caused considerable damage in southwestern India.

Severe Cyclonic Storm Five

Caused considerable damage in East Pakistan, where wind gusts reached . Due advanced warnings, put out an unprecedented 36 hours before the storm, relatively few casualties took place.

Depression Six

Produced torrential rain over northeastern India, with Cherrapunji recording  of precipitation over a four-day span.

Severe Cyclonic Storm Seven

A severe cyclonic storm developed in the Arabian Sea on June 21. The system struck western India before dissipating on June 26.

Depression Eight

A depression developed in the Bay of Bengal on June 27. The system struck the state of West Bengal in India and promptly dissipated.

Depression Nine

The ninth depression of the season existed inland over eastern India. It developed on July 1 and dissipated the following day.

Land Depression Ten

Land Depression Eleven

Another land depression briefly existed over western India from July 18 to July 19.

Depression Twelve

The twelfth depression of the season existed from August 27 to August 28.

Deep Depression Thirteen

Cyclonic Storm Fourteen

Heavy rains from the storm caused significant flooding in Vidarbha and Madhya Pradeshes.

Depression Fifteen

The fifteenth depression of the season developed in the northern Bay of Bengal on September 22. It then struck West Bengal before dissipating on September 23.

Deep Depression Sixteen

A deep depression developed in the Bay of Bengal on September 27. The system then moved inland over West Bengal. It meandered inland until dissipating on October 2.

Land Depression Seventeen

Significant flooding resulted from the depression's heavy rains, with 57 fatalities occurring in Uttar Pradesh.

Depression Eighteen

The final depression of the season developed in the Bay of Bengal on October 24. It soon struck the province of East Pakistan in Pakistan and dissipated on the following day.

See also

 North Indian Ocean tropical cyclone
 List of tropical cyclone records
 List of wettest tropical cyclones
 1961 Atlantic hurricane season
 1961 Pacific hurricane season
 1961 Pacific typhoon season
 Australian region cyclone seasons: 1960–61 1961–62
 South Pacific cyclone seasons: 1960–61 1961–62
 South-West Indian Ocean cyclone seasons: 1960–61 1961–62

References

External links
India Meteorological Department
Joint Typhoon Warning Center 

 
Tropical cyclones in India
North Indian Ocean Cyclone Season